Cevat Seyit (17 July 1906 – 23 November 1945) was a Turkish footballer. He competed in the men's tournament at the 1928 Summer Olympics.

References

External links
 

1906 births
1945 deaths
Turkish footballers
Turkey international footballers
Olympic footballers of Turkey
Footballers at the 1928 Summer Olympics
Footballers from Istanbul
Association football defenders
Fenerbahçe S.K. footballers